The Tengku Permaisuri of Selangor is the title given to the royal consort of the Sultan of Selangor that are not of royal blood.

Status
According to the Laws of the Constitution of Selangor 1959, the consort of the Sultan that are not of royal blood may be given the title Tengku Permaisuri of Selangor if she fulfilled certain criteria. She must be legally wedded wife of the Sultan in accordance with Muslim religion, a Malay and professed the Muslim religion.

She is entitled to an amount of allowance that are determined by the Selangor State Legislative Assembly, which will be charged under the Consolidated Fund.

List of Tengku Permaisuri of Selangor

Title and style
The style used by the reigning consort is Duli Yang Maha Mulia or its English equivalent, Her Royal Highness. 

For example, the full style and title of the reigning Tengku Permaisuri is "Duli Yang Maha Mulia Tengku Permaisuri Norashikin, Tengku Permaisuri Selangor" or in English; "Her Royal Highness Tengku Permaisuri Norashikin, the Tengku Permaisuri of Selangor".

References

 
Selangor
Malaysian royal families
Royal House of Selangor